Belisario Porras is a corregimiento in San Miguelito District, Panamá Province, Panama with a population of 49,367 as of 2010. Its population as of 1990 was 119,400; its population as of 2000 was 49,802.

References

Corregimientos of Panamá Province
San Miguelito District